Melodi may refer to:

In general
the plural of the Latin word melodus (from Greek: , pl. ), "pleasantly singing", "melodious", "melodist"; used in various contexts.

Arts and entertainment

Music

Abstract
Melody, a concept in music.

Groups
Melodi, a Serbian choir, ensemble, of Orthodox Christian sacred music, headed by Divna Ljubojević
 Melodi Music Ensemble, a musical ensemble in Soweto, South Africa,  forming part of the Melodi Music Project, founded by Nimrod Moloto

Television
 Melodi, a Malaysian television show hosted by Saiful Apek during 1998 to 1999.